Cai Haojian (born 24 October 1995) is a Chinese footballer who currently plays for Hubei Chufeng United in the China League Two.

Club career
Cai Haojian entered South China University of Technology in 2013 after declining an invitation from Chinese Super League side Guangzhou Evergrande. He played for amateur club Zhaoqing Hengtai between 2015 and 2017 and helped the club win a qualification for promoting to China League Two in the 2017 China Amateur Football League.

Cai signed his first professional contract with Chinese Super League side Guangzhou R&F on 17 November 2017. He was promoted to the first team squad by Dragan Stojković in the 2018 season. On 2 March 2018, he made his senior debut in a 5–4 away win against city rival Guangzhou Evergrande Taobao, coming on as a substitute for Xiao Zhi in the 90th minute.

Career statistics 
.

References

External links
 

1995 births
Living people
Chinese footballers
People from Jieyang
Footballers from Jieyang
Guangzhou City F.C. players
Chinese Super League players
Association football midfielders
South China University of Technology alumni